Sean MacKinnon (born 24 November 1995) is a Canadian professional racing cyclist. He rode in the men's team pursuit at the 2016 UCI Track Cycling World Championships.

Major results
2015
 3rd  Time trial, Pan American Games
2016
 1st Young rider classification, Flèche du Sud

References

External links
 

1995 births
Living people
Canadian male cyclists
Sportspeople from St. Catharines
Canadian track cyclists
Pan American Games medalists in cycling
Pan American Games bronze medalists for Canada
Cyclists at the 2015 Pan American Games
Medalists at the 2015 Pan American Games
21st-century Canadian people